David Richard Boyd is a Canadian environmental lawyer, activist, and diplomat. He is United Nations Special Rapporteur on human rights and the environment.

Activism 
He supported the Escazu agreement. He supported a Jakarta Clean Air lawsuit. He called on countries to defund coal infrastructure. He is a supporter of the #1Planet1Right campaign. He endorsed a condemnation of the killing of Nacilio Macario. He presented a report about water shortages to the United Nations Human Rights Council.

Education 
He graduated from University of Alberta, and University of Toronto. He was executive director of Ecojustice Canada. He teaches at University of British Columbia.

Works 

 Why all human rights depend on a healthy environment, The Conversation, October 27, 2020 
The Rights of Nature (ECW Press, 2017), ISBN 9781770412392
 The Optimistic Environmentalist (ECW Press, 2015), 
 Cleaner, Greener, Healthier: A Prescription for Stronger Canadian Environmental Laws and Policies (UBC Press, 2015)
 The Environmental Rights Revolution: A Global Study of Constitutions, Human Rights, and the Environment (UBC Press, 2012).

References 

21st-century Canadian lawyers
Environmental law
United Nations special rapporteurs
Year of birth missing (living people)
Living people
Rights of nature